Woo, also spelled Wu or Wo, Ou, U, is a single-syllable Korean given name, and an element in many two-syllable Korean given names. As given name meaning differs based on the hanja used to write it. There are 60 hanja with the reading "woo" on the South Korean government's official list of hanja which may be registered for use in given names.

As a given name

People
People with the single-syllable given name U or Woo include:
 Choe U (1166–1249), military leader of Goryeo
 Wang U (1079–1122), the personal name of King Yejong of Goryeo
 Wang U (1365–1389), the personal name of King U of Goryeo
 Yi U (1912–1945), member of the Korean Imperial household and grandson of Emperor Gojong
 Park Woo (born 1972), South Korean wrestler

First syllable
Masculine
Woo-jin
Woo-sung
Woo-shik

Second syllable
Masculine
Byung-woo
Chang-woo
Chul-woo
Hyun-woo, 5th place in 1980, 2nd place in 1990, 3rd place in 2008, 5th place in 2009
Jin-woo
Jung-woo
Ki-woo
Kun-woo, 6th place in 2008, 7th place in 2009
Min-woo
Sang-woo
Seung-woo
Si-woo, 4th place in 2011, 5th place in 2013, 4th place in 2017
Sung-woo
Tae-woo
Unisex
Ji-woo, 8th place in 2008, 4th place in 2009, 5th place in 2011
Sun-woo
Yeon-woo

See also
List of Korean given names

References

Korean given names